Alexander Durley (December 18, 1912 – July 18, 1980) was an American college football coach, college athletics administrator, and mathematics professor. He served as the head football coach at Texas College from 1942 to 1948, at Texas Southern University from 1949 to 1964, and at Prairie View A&M University from 1969 to 1970. He was inducted into the Southwestern Athletic Conference Hall of Fame in 1992.

Career
Durley was the head football coach at Texas College from 1942 to 1948, compiling a record of 45–15–6. From 1949 to 1964, Durley was head football coach and director of athletics at Texas Southern University. His coaching record there was 101–55–8. In their second year in the Midwest Athletic Association, Texas Southern went undefeated; in 1952 they beat Prairie View A&M in the Prairie View Bowl to win the black college football national championship; in their first season in the Southwestern Athletic Conference, 1958–1959, they shared the league championship with Wiley College. He was also a mathematics professor at TSU.

Durley was also the tenth head football coach at Prairie View A&M University for two seasons, from 1969 to 1970. His coaching record at Prairie View was 8–10–1.

Death and honors
Durley died on July 18, 1980, in Houston, Texas. He was survived by his wife, Wilma, and two daughters.

In 1992 Durley was inducted into the Southwestern Athletic Conference Hall of Fame. The Alexander Durley Sports Complex at TSU is named for him.

Head coaching record

References

External links
 

1912 births
1980 deaths
Prairie View A&M Panthers and Lady Panthers athletic directors
Prairie View A&M Panthers football coaches
Texas College Steers football coaches
Texas College Steers football players
Texas Southern Tigers athletic directors
Texas Southern Tigers football coaches
African-American coaches of American football
African-American players of American football
African-American college athletic directors in the United States
20th-century African-American sportspeople